The toucan-barbets are the  small bird genus Semnornis. This was often included in the paraphyletic barbets but recently usually considered a distinct family Semnornithidae; alternatively, all barbets might be moved to the toucan family Ramphastidae as a subfamily, Semnornithinae. It contains only two species, the toucan barbet (S. ramphastinus) and the prong-billed barbet (S. frantzii).

Description
The toucan barbet is larger than the prong-billed barbet and considerably heavier. They possess large, swollen bills and lack strong sexual dimorphism in their plumage. The plumage of the prong-billed barbet is orange-brown, and that of the toucan barbet is more distinctively patterned with black, red, grey and gold.

Distribution and habitat
The Semnornis toucan-barbets are found in the Neotropics. The prong-billed barbet is restricted to the humid highland forests of Costa Rica and Panama. The toucan barbet is found in similar habitats in the western montane forests of Ecuador and Colombia. In addition to primary forest they may occupy forest edges and secondary growth. Neither species is migratory, and young birds do not appear to disperse very far after fledging; young toucan barbets only disperse 0.5 km.

Behaviour
The Semnornithidae are highly social, and may be seen either in small groups of up to five or six individuals, or as singles. They are active during the day and are early risers. The prong-billed barbet sleeps in communal roosts at night in the non-breeding season. As many as 19 birds may roost together in a hole, either a modified nest or the abandoned nest of a woodpecker. During the breeding season pairs roost in their own nests.

Diet and feeding
The diet of these two species is made up of fruits and insects. The ratio of the two is more similar to the toucans than other barbets and is dominated by fruits. A 1993 study of the stomach contents of these two species found only fruit. Fruits may be eaten whole, held in the foot and broken and eaten, or crushed and only the juices eaten. Insects are more common in the diet of nestlings, and compose 40% of the food brought to the nest in toucan-barbets. Toucan-barbets may also feed their chicks small numbers of vertebrates. They have also been recorded eating flowers.

Breeding
Both species of toucan-barbet are monogamous breeders. Prong-billed barbets defend breeding territories from all others of their species. Toucan barbets, on the other hand, have territories but are helped in raising the young by helpers.

Species

References

Further reading
Edinburgh New Philosophical Journal, (New series) 2 no.2 p. 404

External links
Barbet videos on the Internet Bird Collection
Don Roberson's Bird Families of the World

 
Bird genera
Higher-level bird taxa restricted to the Neotropics
Taxa named by Charles Wallace Richmond